Belosaepia, occasionally incorrectly Belosepia, is an extinct genus of cuttlefish-like cephalopod known from the Eocene.

Morphology
The shell was endogastrically coiled. It had a small belemnite-like guard, which took the form of a short horn at the posterior end of the shell; usually, only a small portion of the shell closest to the guard is preserved. The chambers in the shell closely resemble those present in the cuttlebone of modern cuttlefish.

Ecology
Belosaepia lived close to the sea floor.

References

Cenozoic cephalopods
Prehistoric cephalopod genera
Eocene animals of Europe